The HKFYG Lee Shau Kee College (Chinese: 香港青年協會李兆基書院) is a Hong Kong Secondary School located in Tin Shui Wai, New Territories. Founded in 2006, it was the second school in Tin Shui Wai sponsored by HKFYG and funded by Lee Shau-kee, the first being the HKFYG Lee Shau Kee Primary School.

Motto
Wisdom in Action and 3-S, Self-directed learning, Self-discipline and Self-efficacy

Class structure & Size
From Secondary 1 to Secondary 6, there would be 5 streams for each level, with no more than 35 students per class. Under the New Senior Secondary curriculum, students would be grouped according to their choice of elective subjects.

Curriculum
The school follows the local six-year secondary school system in an English medium. For Form 1 to Form 3 students, The following subject would be offered:
 Chinese Language
 English Language
 Mathematics
 Integrated Science 
 Biology
 Chemistry
 Physics
 Integrated Humanities (To be cancelled in 2019-20)
 Economics
 History
 Geography
 Computer Literacy
 Visual Arts
 Music 
 Physical & Health Education (PHE)

For Form 4 to Form 6 students, the school follows the New Senior Secondary Curriculum. All students take 4 compulsory subjects:
 Chinese Language
 English Language
 Mathematics (Compulsory Part)
 Liberal Studies

Plus 2 to 3 elective subjects from the following options:
 Chinese Literature
 English Literature (To be offered in 2019-20)
 Chinese History
 History
 Geography
 Economics
 Tourism & Hospitality Studies
 Business, Accounting & Financial Studies
 Information & Communication Technology
 Physics
 Chemistry
 Biology
 Visual Arts (To be offered in 2019-20)
Note: Mathematics (Extended Module) is also offered but it is not counted as an elective subject.

Visual Arts, Music and PHE classes would be part of the school curriculum.

References

Secondary schools in Hong Kong